Martin Kissinger Gantz (January 28, 1862 – February 10, 1916) was an American lawyer and politician who served as a U.S. Representative from Ohio for one term from 1891 to 1893.

Early life and career 
Born in Bethel Township, Miami County, Ohio, Gantz attended the common schools and National Normal University, Lebanon, Ohio.
He was graduated from the Cincinnati Law School in 1883.
He was admitted to the bar in 1883 and commenced practice in Troy, Ohio.
He served as mayor of the city of Troy in 1889.

Congress 
Gantz was elected as a Democrat to the Fifty-second Congress (March 4, 1891 – March 3, 1893).
He was an unsuccessful candidate for reelection in 1892 to the Fifty-third Congress.

Later career and death 
He resumed the practice of law in Troy.

He served as commissioner from the State of Ohio to the Louisiana Purchase Exposition in 1904.
He served as delegate to all Democratic State conventions from 1892 to 1906.
He served as delegate to the 1908 Democratic National Convention.

He represented the United States State Department on the directorate of El Banco Nacional de Nicaragua y El Ferrocarril del Pacífico de Nicaragua in 1914 and 1915.

Death
He died in Troy, Ohio, February 10, 1916.
He was interred in Riverside Cemetery.

References

Sources

1862 births
1916 deaths
People from Miami County, Ohio
Democratic Party members of the United States House of Representatives from Ohio
People from Troy, Ohio
Ohio lawyers
University of Cincinnati College of Law alumni
National Normal University alumni
Mayors of places in Ohio
19th-century American politicians
19th-century American lawyers